Ghriss District is a district of Mascara Province, Algeria.

Municipalities
The district is further divided into 5 municipalities:
Ghriss
Makdha
Matemore
Sidi Boussaid
Maoussa

Districts of Mascara Province